Muelle de los Bueyes is a town and a municipality in the South Caribbean Coast Autonomous Region of Nicaragua.

References 

Municipalities of the South Caribbean Coast Autonomous Region